Pierre Paul Vermoyal (18 October 1888 – 28 September 1925) was a French stage and film actor.

Biography
Vermoyal was born in Braye-en-Laonnois, Aisne, Picardy. He began his career on the stages of the Grand Guignol theatre in the Quartier Pigalle area of Paris in the 1910s. His first known film appearance was in the 1916 Maurice Mariaud directed short film Le roi de l'étain, produced by Pathé Frères. He would go on to appear in a number of films during the 1910s directed by Mariaud, Abel Gance, Jean Manoussi and Robert Boudrioz, among others.

In 1922 he appeared in the Charles Burguet directed serial film The Mysteries of Paris as Maître Ferrand. The film serial ran in twelve installments and was based on the novel of the same name by Eugène Sue. Other prominent film roles of the era include appearances in the  Léonce Perret directed Koenigsmark (1923), starring Maurice Lehmann and Huguette Duflos; the Edward José directed Terreur (1924), opposite American actress Pearl White; and the American film The Arab (1924), directed by Rex Ingram and starring Ramon Novarro and Alice Terry. His final film appearance was in the 1925 Benito Perojo directed Au-delà de la mort  (also known as Plus loin que la mort and Pour l’amour de son frère.)

Paul Vermoyal died on 28 September 1925 at age 36 in Amélie-les-Bains-Palalda, France.

Partial filmography

References

External links

1888 births
1925 deaths
French male stage actors
French male film actors
French male silent film actors
People from Aisne
20th-century French male actors